Sharon Dixon could refer to: 

Sharon Pratt (born 1944), formerly Sharon Pratt Dixon, former mayor of Washington, D.C.
Sharon Denise Dixon (born 1962), former member of the Chicago City Council